Christopher Johnston, M.D., Ph.D. (December 8, 1856 – June 26, 1914) was an American physician and Assyriologist, a scholar of ancient Mesopotamia.

Personal life
He was born on December 8, 1856 in Baltimore, the son of the physician Christopher Johnston (1822-1891), a professor of surgery at the University of Maryland and the discoverer of Johnston's organ, and Sarah Lucretia Clay (1835-1879). Johnston married Madeline T. Tilghman and had a son, Benamin Johnston, and a daughter, Eliza Gates Johnston, who died young.

Studies and career
Johnston studied at the University of Virginia, where he earned three degrees: a B. Litt. in 1876, a B.A. 1878, and an M.A. in 1879.  He graduated from the medical department of the University of Maryland in 1880, practiced medicine until 1888 in Baltimore (while concurrently studying various languages), then entered Johns Hopkins to study Assyriology and Semitics, taking the degree of Ph.D. in 1894.  Johnston continued on to become a Professor of Oriental History and Archaeology at Hopkins.  He published Epistolary Literature of the Assyrians and Babylonians (1896) and edited Ancient Empires of the East (1906).  He was also responsible for writing the New International Encyclopedia's chapter concerning Egyptology.

Works
 (1894 Ph.D. dissertation)
 (notes by Carl Heinrich Cornill)

References

1858 births
1914 deaths
Physicians from Baltimore
American historians
Writers from Baltimore
American Assyriologists
University of Virginia alumni
University of Maryland, Baltimore alumni
Johns Hopkins University alumni
Johns Hopkins University faculty